A list of horror films released in 1992.

References

Sources

 
 
 
 
 

Lists of horror films by year
1992-related lists